Anatoli Klimenko (born September 2, 1963 in Karaganda) is a Belarusian sport shooter. He competed in rifle shooting events at the 1996 and 2000 Summer Olympics.

Olympic results

References

1963 births
Living people
ISSF rifle shooters
Belarusian male sport shooters
Shooters at the 1996 Summer Olympics
Shooters at the 2000 Summer Olympics
Olympic shooters of Belarus